Peter Heinz (born 27 June 1954) is a German sports shooter. He competed in two events at the 1984 Summer Olympics.

References

External links
 

1954 births
Living people
German male sport shooters
Olympic shooters of West Germany
Shooters at the 1984 Summer Olympics
People from Kassel (district)
Sportspeople from Kassel (region)